Doin' Allright is an album by American jazz saxophonist Dexter Gordon recorded in 1961 and released on the Blue Note label.

Reception

The Allmusic review by Scott Yanow awarded the album 4 stars and stating "The title of this Blue Note set, Doin' Allright, fit perfectly at the time, for tenor saxophonist Dexter Gordon was making the first of three successful comebacks. Largely neglected during the 1950s, Gordon's Blue Note recordings (of which this was the first) led to his "rediscovery".

Track listing
All compositions by Dexter Gordon except as indicated

 "I Was Doing All Right" (George Gershwin, Ira Gershwin) - 9:18
 "You've Changed" (Bill Carey, Carl T. Fischer) - 7:26
 "For Regulars Only" - 5:45
 "Society Red" - 12:21
 "It's You or No One" (Sammy Cahn, Jule Styne) - 6:13
 "I Want More" - 6:11 Bonus track on CD reissue
 "For Regulars Only" [Alternate take] - 6:20 Bonus track on CD reissue

Personnel
Dexter Gordon - tenor saxophone
Freddie Hubbard - trumpet
Horace Parlan - piano
George Tucker - bass
Al Harewood - drums

References

Blue Note Records albums
Dexter Gordon albums
1961 albums
Albums produced by Alfred Lion
Albums recorded at Van Gelder Studio